Kosmos 66 ( meaning Cosmos 66) or Zenit-2 No.27 was a Soviet, first generation, low resolution, optical film-return reconnaissance satellite launched in 1965.

Kosmos 66 was launched by a Vostok-2 rocket, serial number R15002-04, flying from Site 31/6 at the Baikonur Cosmodrome. The launch took place at 09:50 GMT on 7 May 1965, and following its successful arrival in orbit the spacecraft received its Kosmos designation; along with the International Designator 1965-035A and the Satellite Catalog Number 01362.

On 15 May 1965, after eight days in orbit, the satellite was deorbited so that its return capsule could be recovered and its photos analysed, however, the mission was unsuccessful because a parachute deployment failed and the spacecraft was destroyed in the subsequent crash.

References

Kosmos satellites
Spacecraft launched in 1965
Spacecraft which reentered in 1965
Zenit-2 satellites